Rasmus Walter-Hansen is a Danish singer and guitarist originating from Aarhus. He is twin-brother of filmmaker Anders Walter. His debut album was the self-titled Rasmus Walter in 2011 with debut single being "Dybt vand".

Prior to a solo career, Walter was the lead vocalist and guitarist of the pop rock band Grand Avenue that included also Niels-Kristian Bærentzen (guitar), Marc Stebbing (bass) and Hjalte Thygesen (drums).

Discography

Albums 
as Grand Avenue
2003: Grand Avenue
2005: She
2007: The Outside
2009: Place to Fall

Solo

Solo live

Singles 
Solo

Others

References

External links 
Official website

Danish male singers
Living people
People from Aarhus
Year of birth missing (living people)